Laure Manaudou (born 9 October 1986) is a retired French Olympic, world and European champion swimmer. She has held the world record in freestyle events between 200 and 1500 meter. She is the daughter of a French father and a Dutch mother, and she is the older sister of Florent Manaudou who is also an Olympic gold medalist swimmer.

Career

2004 Olympics
She won the gold medal in the women's 400-meter freestyle at the 2004 Athens Olympics. It was France's first gold medal ever in women's swimming and the first swimming gold medal won by a French athlete since Jean Boiteux's victory in the 400-meter men's freestyle event at Helsinki in 1952. Manaudou won the silver medal in the women's 800-meter freestyle at the Athens Olympics. In that race, she had a quick start but was passed down the stretch by Ai Shibata of Japan. She also won the bronze medal in the women's 100-meter backstroke, thus becoming only the 2nd Frenchwoman to win three medals in a single Olympic Games, Summer or Winter. The first one was the track and field athlete Micheline Ostermeyer in London in 1948. Manaudou was by far the best swimmer on the French team, but she did not have the team support to win a medal in the women's 4×200 m freestyle relay.

Manaudou is currently tied for third (three medals altogether) on the all-time list of French multiple female Winter or Summer Olympic medal winners along with Micheline Ostermeyer, Marielle Goitschel, Pascale Trinquet-Hachin, Perrine Pelen, Anne Briand-Bouthiaux, Marie-José Pérec, Félicia Ballanger and Camille Muffat. The all-time leader is the fencer Laura Flessel-Colovic, who has five Olympic medals.

2004 European Championships
Laure Manaudou won three gold medals at the 2004 European Swimming Championships in Madrid, Spain, in the 100-metre backstroke, 400-metre freestyle, and the 4×100-metre medley relay.

2005 World Championships
On 24 July 2005 at the 2005 World Aquatics Championships in Montreal, Canada, Manaudou won the women's 400-m freestyle. Manaudou was under world record pace for the first half of the race. In the second half of the race, Manaudou was challenged by Shibata, her rival from the Olympics. Pundits were already predicting that Manaudou would eventually eclipse the world-record mark in the 400-m freestyle set by Janet Evans at the 1988 Summer Olympics. This would happen on 12 May 2006, as she broke Evans's world record of 4:03.85 during the final of the French championship in Tours with the time of 4:03.03.

2006 European Championships
On 12 May 2006, Manaudou broke Janet Evans's world record in the women's 400-meter freestyle swim that had stood for 18 years. Manaudou then held the same world record for nearly two years.

On 6 August 2006, on the final day of the 2006 European Swimming Championships in Budapest, she broke her own world record with a time of 4:02.13 in winning the 400-m freestyle title. She also won the 800-m freestyle (in European record time), 200-m individual medley and 100-m backstroke titles. In addition, she obtained the bronze medal in the 200-m freestyle, 4×200-m team freestyle and 4×100-m team medley. With her four titles, she equalled the record of the number of individual titles won in the same European swimming championships held by East Germany's Ute Geweniger (1981) and Hungary's Krisztina Egerszegi (1993).

2007 World Championships
Manaudou broke the 200-m freestyle world record at the 2007 World Swimming Championships in Melbourne in winning the final. She also won the 400-m freestyle event. She obtained silver medals in the 100-m backstroke and the 800-m freestyle, and a bronze for 4×200-m freestyle relay. In the 100-m backstroke, she became the second woman in history to swim under a minute in the event. She was leading the race in the 800-m final going into the last lap, but the American Kate Ziegler finally overtook her in the last metres to win by a margin of 28 cm. She was thus prevented from becoming the first female swimmer to win the 200-m, 400-m and 800-m freestyle titles at the same World Championships.

2008 Olympics
In the 2008 Summer Olympics, Manaudou was unable to recapture her form from the 2004 Summer Olympics in Athens. After starting strong and holding the lead at the 200-meter mark, she finished last (eighth) in the 400-m freestyle final with a finishing time of 4:11.26. After the defeat, Manaudou admitted giving up during the race after struggling to keep up. She then finished seventh in the 100-m backstroke final. In her final hope for a medal, in the 200-m backstroke, she finished last in her semifinal heat and was eliminated.

Retirement and comeback
On 17 September 2009, at 22 years of age, Manaudou announced through the newspaper Le Parisien her retirement from competitive swimming. She was quoted as saying, "It came to me little by little. I didn’t make it on impulse. It has matured slowly."
In October 2010, she returned to training in the United States with the Auburn University Tigers swim team. She made her return to competition on July 14, 2011, in Tigers colours at a small swimming meet in Athens, Georgia, in the United States, where
she set a personal record in the 50-m freestyle event (25.84 s).

2012 Olympics
Manaudou competed in the 2012 Summer Olympics in three events – 100 m backstroke, 200 m backstroke, and the 4 × 100 m medley relay.  She failed to advance from the first round heats in all the three events.  However, she was poolside on August 3 as her younger brother Florent won a surprise victory in the men's 50 m freestyle final, and embraced him following his victory

Personal life
The weekly magazine Paris Match ran a cover story on Manaudou in its 5–11 April 2007 issue.

Manaudou is now dating Fréro Delavega singer Jérémy Frérot, with whom she has a son Lou, born on July 18, 2017

Accomplishments
Between June 2004 and April 2008, Manaudou remained unbeaten in the 400-metre freestyle, winning 23 finals in succession.

 WR : World record
 ER : European record
 NR : National record
 CR : Championship record

Career best times
 200-m freestyle: 1.55.51
 400-m freestyle: 4:02.13
 800-m freestyle: 8:18.80
 100-m backstroke: 59.50
 200-m backstroke: 2:06.64

See also
 World record progression 200 metres freestyle
 World record progression 400 metres freestyle
 World record progression 800 metres freestyle
 World record progression 1500 metres freestyle

References

External links

  
 
 "Laure Manaudou", n°27 on Time's list of "100 Olympic Athletes To Watch"

1986 births
Living people
People from Villeurbanne
French female freestyle swimmers
French female backstroke swimmers
World record setters in swimming
Olympic swimmers of France
Swimmers at the 2004 Summer Olympics
Swimmers at the 2008 Summer Olympics
Swimmers at the 2012 Summer Olympics
Olympic gold medalists for France
Olympic silver medalists for France
Olympic bronze medalists for France
Recipients of the Legion of Honour
French people of Dutch descent
Olympic bronze medalists in swimming
French female medley swimmers
World Aquatics Championships medalists in swimming
European Aquatics Championships medalists in swimming
European champions for France
Medalists at the 2004 Summer Olympics
Olympic gold medalists in swimming
Olympic silver medalists in swimming
Mediterranean Games gold medalists for France
Swimmers at the 2005 Mediterranean Games
Mediterranean Games medalists in swimming
Sportspeople from Lyon Metropolis